Fremantle is a Western Australian suburb located at the mouth of the Swan River, and is situated  from the Perth central business district. One of the original settlements of the Swan River Colony established in 1829 is within the area known today as this suburb.

Geography
Fremantle is bounded by the Swan River to the north and north-west, the Indian Ocean to the west, South Street to the south, and the suburbs of East Fremantle and White Gum Valley to the east. The central part of the suburb extends eastwards to include Royal Fremantle Golf Club and a suburban area south of Marmion Street and west of Carrington Street.

Population
According to the 2016 census of population, there were 8,211 people in Fremantle.

 Aboriginal and Torres Strait Islander people made up 1.5% of the population. 
 56.0% of people were born in Australia. The most common countries of birth were England 10.4%, New Zealand 2.7%, Italy 2.7% and Ireland 1.2%.   
  75.3% of people spoke only English at home. Other languages spoken at home included Italian at 4.1%. 
 The most common responses for religion were No Religion 45.1% and Catholic 19.9%.

Transport
Fremantle contains the Fremantle railway station, which serves as both the terminus of the Fremantle railway line and a bus station serving the surrounding region. All services are operated by Swan Transit and Transdev WA as part of the  Transperth network.

Schools
Fremantle is home to University of Notre Dame Australia's main campus; two annexes of the Challenger Institute of Technology (formerly Challenger TAFE); a public high school, John Curtin College of the Arts; and a private high school, CBC Fremantle. Other schools in the suburb are the historic Fremantle Primary School (known until the 1990s as South Terrace Primary), East Fremantle Primary School, and Lance Holt School (an independent primary school on Henry Street).

References

External links

Suburbs of Perth, Western Australia
Suburbs in the City of Fremantle
Fremantle